Bindaios, also Binda, was a town of ancient Pisidia inhabited during Roman and Byzantine times. Under the name Binda, it became the seat of a bishop.

Its site is located near Küçük Gökceli (formerly Findos) in Asiatic Turkey.

Ecclesiastical history
The bishop of Binda was a suffragan bishop of Antiochia in Pisidia.

No longer a residential bishopric, it remains a titular see of the Roman Catholic Church. Past incumbents include John D'Alton (1942–1943), Ignácio Krause (1944–1946), Celestino Fernández y Fernández (1948–1952), Eugen Seiterich (1952–1954), Bernard Joseph Topel (1955–1955), Joseph Calasanz Fließer (1956–1960), Cletus Joseph Benjamin (1960–1961), Gaetano Alibrandi (1961–2003).

References

Populated places in Pisidia
Former populated places in Turkey
Roman towns and cities in Turkey
Populated places of the Byzantine Empire
Catholic titular sees in Asia
History of Isparta Province
Isparta Central District
Titular sees in Asia